Borislav Velichkov (born 30 May 1961) is a Bulgarian wrestler. He competed in the men's Greco-Roman 74 kg at the 1988 Summer Olympics.

References

1961 births
Living people
Bulgarian male sport wrestlers
Olympic wrestlers of Bulgaria
Wrestlers at the 1988 Summer Olympics
Sportspeople from Sofia